Tonya Monique Foster, usually credited as Tonya M. Foster, is an American poet, essayist, and educator from New Orleans. A 2020–2021 Radcliffe Institute for Advanced Study Fellow and recipient of a 2020 Creative Capital Award, she holds the George and Judy Marcus Endowed Chair in the Creative Writing Department at San Francisco State University.

Previously she taught at California College of the Arts.

Bibliography

 A Swarm of Bees in High Court
 La Grammaire des Os
 Third Mind: Creative Writing through Visual Art (co-editor)

References

External links
 Poetry Foundation
 PennSound audio

Living people
20th-century American poets
20th-century American women writers
American women poets
American poets
African-American poets
Writers from New Orleans
Year of birth missing (living people)
20th-century African-American women writers
20th-century African-American writers
21st-century African-American people
21st-century African-American women